Ignacio García Malo (1760–1812) was a Spanish playwright, translator, Hellenist and writer.

Spanish male writers
People from the Province of Cuenca
1760 births
1812 deaths